Aaha Kalyanam is a 2014 Indian Tamil-language romantic comedy film directed by debutant A. Gokul Krishna and produced by Aditya Chopra's Yash Raj Films. A remake of Maneesh Sharma's 2010 Hindi film, Band Baaja Baaraat, the film stars Simran, Nani and Vaani Kapoor. Although it was planned for bilingual release, it was shot completely in Tamil, and a dubbed Telugu version was released simultaneously along with the Tamil version. The film was released worldwide on 21 February 2014.

Plot

Shakthi (Nani) is street-smart and fun-loving. Intelligent and quirky Shruti (Vaani Kapoor), who assists the wedding coordinator, sees Shakthi at the front of the food serving line and suspects he is gatecrashing to eat for free. She confronts Shakthi, who quickly summons his friend, the videographer at the wedding, and pretends he is part of the film crew and has a right to be there. After seeing Shruti dance at the wedding, Shakthi cannot resist the temptation to make a video of her doing her dance routine. The next day, Shakthi calls those involved in the wedding and manages to get Shruti's name and college. He chases her down on her bus ride home and tries to impress her with a DVD of her dance routine at the wedding. Shruti is not interested in Shakthi and reveals her aim in life is starting her own wedding planning business by the name 'Getti Melam'. Shakthi's enthusiasm for courtship is quickly dampened once Shruti launches a long pitch of her business ideas.

Shakthi is under pressure from his parents to come back to their village and work in sugarcane fields, and Shruti is being coaxed by her family to get married at the earliest. She makes a deal with her parents that after her exams, she will take five years to get her business running before she marries. When Shakthi's father comes to take him back to his village, Shakthi refuses and lies he is starting a wedding planning business. He goes back to Shruti, who refuses him as she is worried that romantic complications would arise. Shakthi promises it will never be a problem, but Shruti is not interested.

Shruti meets with Chandralekha (Simran), a famous wedding planner, with Shakthi tagging along. She hopes she will be hired and get the opportunity to learn about planning "high-class weddings". Chandra shows no interest but loses one of her male workers. She spots Shakthi next to Shruti and offers him the job. Shakthi accepts on the condition both he and Shruti are hired together. While checking the arrangements, Shruti learns that Chandra cheats her clients. Later, when an irate bride's father confronts Chandra, she blames Shruti, claiming it was her fault. Angry at Chandra for accusing Shruti, Shakthi says she has no right to treat her employees like this. They quit and Shruti, calling him her partner, leaves with him, warning Chandra that they will cross paths.

The two begin "Getti Melam" with the work equally split between the two. Their first project is very successful and the duo plans many more small weddings. Finally, they get their first big client. After a lot of work, the wedding is a huge success. That night after the event, they dance and both end up drunk. A simple hug turns into more, and the two make love that night. Afterwards, Shakthi lies awake all night, worried about what has happened. When Shruti starts calling him "dear" in the morning, he is uncomfortable with it. Not wanting to hurt her feelings, he behaves awkwardly around her, while Shruti realizes she has fallen in love with him. She tries to reassure him she is not like other women. Shakthi, misunderstanding, believes she is telling him the night didn't mean anything to her. Relieved, he tells her it meant nothing to him as well. Shruti pretends to agree but cries after he leaves. This creates a tense atmosphere between the two. They have a huge fight, resulting in Shruti breaking the partnership and forcing Shakthi to leave the company. Shakthi starts his own wedding planning business and the two go their separate ways. However, they don't do as well by themselves and end up plunging into debt.

They get a big contract, but it is contingent upon them working together as a team. The bride had been a guest at the first big wedding they had done and wanted the same level for her own wedding. They agree to partner up again for this one wedding for the sake of recovering their own losses. They divvy up the workload and each focuses on their own departments. Shakthi and Shruti perform together for the wedding. The performance is a success and the following day, Shakthi tells Shruti they should be partners again, saying Getti Melam was never as successful as when they were together. Shruti refuses his offer, telling him in two months she will marry her fiancé Siddharth and will move to Dubai with him after the wedding. Shakthi is stunned and argues with her that she can't get married, saying it is "totally wrong".

During the rest of the wedding preparations, Shakthi pesters Shruti about her engagement, claiming she would be moving too far from her parents or Dubai wouldn't suit her. When none of those reason dissuade her, Shakthi accuses her of marrying to make him jealous, claiming that she had fallen in love with him and this was a way to get revenge because he paid her no heed after their night together. Shruti answers she is not doing it for revenge, but for her own security and her parents' satisfaction to see her settled in life. She admits she did fall in love with him, but since he didn't feel the same, she had moved on. Shruti answers a call from Siddharth and walks away sadly, leaving Shakthi alone.

At the sudden thought of losing her forever, Shakthi realizes he has always been in love with Shruti but was too scared to acknowledge it in fear of jeopardizing the business. Desperate to win her back, Shakthi steals Siddharth's phone number and calls him, telling him to back off and that Shruti is his. Hearing what Shakthi had done to Siddharth, Shruti runs off to find Shakthi and confronts him where he is waiting for her on a rooftop. Shakthi tells Shruti he'd loved her all along and was a fool to have run away from her love. Shruti calls off her engagement and the two share a passionate hug.

Cast

 Nani as Shakthivel "Shakthi"
 Vaani Kapoor as Shruti Subramaniam (Voice dubbed by Chinmayi)
 Simran as Chandralekha, a famous wedding-planner (Voice dubbed by Deepa Venkat)
 Karthik Nagarajan as GK  
 Badava Gopi as Hyder
 M. J. Shriram as Ramesh
 Five Star Krishna as Inspector Akhilan
 Dhanajayan as Tyre King
 Neela as Shruti's mother
 Paaki as Shruthi's father
 Henna as Shruthi's sister
 Ajith Menon as Shakthi's father
 Azhar as Danny
 Shuvakar S as Rahul
 Shwetha Shekar as Shalini
 Gandarv Dhinora as Abbas
 Gayatri MR as Sana

Production

UTV Motion Pictures were reported to have cast Ravi Teja and Trisha in the Telugu version of the film titled Bamchikbam, but the studio later dismissed reports. Other reports suggested that Tamannaah would feature in a Tamil version of the film alongside a newcomer, but Yash Raj Films maintained that they had not sold the remake rights of the film and would produce South Indian versions of the film themselves. The Tamil and Telugu versions of the film were cast in doubt when Yash Raj Studios chose to pursue legal action against the makers of the Telugu film, Jabardasth, citing the film's plot was inspired directly from Band Baaja Baaraat. However, the producers maintained that a South Indian version would still go ahead.

Nani signed on to be the leading actor of the film in December 2012 and a photo shoot was held with actress Vaani Kapoor, who had appeared in Yash Raj Films' Hindi ventures, by March 2013. During the making of the film, Vaani Kapoor took training in Tamil and Telugu, while she also revealed that the original Hindi film's script would be adapted to suit the culture of the South Indian audience. Dharan Kumar was signed on to be music director for the project, composing new tunes rather than retaining the original film's music.

The project began shoot by the end of May 2013 and shot in Hyderabad with Padam Kumar, head of Yash Raj Film's operation in South India, being appointed the creative producer on the project. Scenes were shot predominantly in a swift schedule in Chennai, completing most portions of the shoot with little publicity. The team then shot a schedule in early September 2013 in Mysore in a set erected near Lalith Mahal Hotel, with rain partially disrupting progress. Although it was planned as a bilingual it was completely filmed in Tamil only and was later dubbed in Telugu while the songs and climax scenes were individually shot in both the languages.

Release 
The film initially scheduled to release on 7 February 2014 but postponed to 21 February 2014.  The film released in 900 screens worldwide for both versions.

Critical reception 
Baradwaj Rangan from The Hindu wrote "Gokul Krishna's remake follows the original almost beat for beat, but never does anything more. And despite some wonderfully conversational dialogue, we're left with the strange feeling of watching a Hindi movie dubbed in Tamil, along with the realisation that a story alone doesn't make a movie." IANS gave the film 2.5 stars out of 5 and stated "Aaha Kalyanam is like going to a colourful wedding and being served tasteless food." Gautaman Bhaskaran from Hindustan Times gave a review stating "Indeed, despite high production values (a contrast to most Tamil movies which suffer in this area) and an impressive degree of sophistry (which Bollywood cinema is known for), Aaha Kalyanam did not wow me" and rated the film 2/5.

M. Suganth of The Times of India rated the film 3 stars out of 5 and stated "like the concept of wedding planning, the film too feels a little alien, and we don't really fall in love with it entirely.... And, yet, for all these flaws, Aaha Kalyanam manages to hold your interest and that is mainly because of Habib Faisal's winning script." Sify wrote, "This new-age romance works big time due to the spontaneity of the fresh lead pair, as they light up the screen with their terrific on-screen chemistry. Debutant director Gokul Krisha has packaged the film smartly." IndiaGlitz too gave a positive review stating "In all, the movie is a clean entertainer for all" and added that the film is a "Fun, frolic and colourful lighthearted enjoyment" and rated the film 3.5/5. Behindwoods gave 2.75 stars out of 5 and wrote, "Aaha Kalyanam is like a near perfect wedding, which has very less unpleasant moments that are completely overshadowed by the overflowing happiness."

Box office
The opened 80–90% occupancy on first day collected 7.62 crore at the box office while in Telugu version grossed 4 crore for adding up 11.62 crore at the box office, which is the biggest ever opening in Nani's career. According to the International Business Times, the film subsequently did average business in Tamil Nadu, while its performance in Andhra Pradesh was poor. The film was overall a commercial success.

Soundtrack

The soundtrack for Aaha Kalyanam was composed by Dharan Kumar. The lyrics were written by Thamarai and Madhan Karky.

References

External links
 
 

Tamil remakes of Hindi films
2014 films
Films about Indian weddings
Yash Raj Films films
2010s Tamil-language films
Films set in Chennai
Indian romantic comedy films
2014 romantic comedy films
Films scored by Dharan Kumar